The Ulster White Limestone Group is a late Cretaceous lithostratigraphic group (a sequence of rock strata) in Northern Ireland. The name is derived from the characteristic chalk rock which occurs particularly along the Antrim coast. The strata are exposed on or near to both the northern and eastern coasts of Antrim and also between Portrush and Dungiven within County Londonderry. Further outcrops occur between Belfast and Lurgan and between Dungannon and Magherafelt. The current names replace an earlier situation where the present group was considered to be a formation and each of the present formations was considered a 'member'. Several other stratigraphic naming schemes were in use during the nineteenth century and much of the twentieth century.  This group and the underlying Hibernian Greensands Group are the stratigraphical equivalent of the Chalk Group of southern and eastern England.

Stratigraphy
 Post-Larry Bane Chalk Subgroup
 Ballycastle Chalk Formation
 Port Calliagh Chalk Formation
 Tanderagee Chalk Formation
 Ballymagarry Chalk Formation
 Portush Chalk Formation
 Garron Chalk Formation
 Glenarm Chalk Formation
 Ballintoy Chalk Formation
 Larry Bane Chalk Formation
 Pre-Larry Bane Chalk Subgroup
 Boheeshane Chalk Formation
 Greggan Chalk Formation
 Cloghastucan Chalk Formation
 Galboly Chalk Formation
 Clogfin Sponge Formation

There is an unconformity (non-sequence) at the base of the Boheeshane Chalk Formation.

References

Geologic groups of Europe
Geologic formations of Ireland
Geology of Northern Ireland
Upper Cretaceous Series of Europe
Limestone formations